PSP2 or PSP 2 may refer to:
 Phantasy Star Portable 2, a video game
 PlayStation Vita or PSP 2, a successor to the PlayStation Portable handheld game console
 RBM14 or PSP2, a prote un

See also
 PlayStation Portable